Ehrenhalt is a surname. Notable people with the surname include:

 Alan Ehrenhalt (born 1947), American journalist and non-fiction author
 Amaranth Ehrenhalt (1928–2021), American painter, sculptor, and writer